Qullqi (Aymara and Quechua for silver, money, Hispanicized spelling Colque) is a mountain in the Andes in southern  Peru, about  high. It is situated in the Puno Region, Lampa Province, Pucará District.

References

Mountains of Peru
Mountains of Puno Region